Shahid is the first and largest Arabic content streaming platform in the Middle East and North Africa region (MENA). Part of MBC GROUP, Shahid is home to original productions from the Arab world, a wide range of exclusive movies and premieres, as well as the top watched live Arab TV channels.

Shahid Original series 
In 2019, Shahid began producing their own originals series. The first series that premiered under the aegis of Shahid Original series was El Diva, a drama featuring superstar Cyrine Abdelnour, and Yacob Alfarhan.

The platform has rapidly grown its portfolio to include original content from different countries, and genres that range from drama to comedy to thriller. Shahid Original series are available exclusively to Shahid VIP subscribers.

All programming is in Arabic, listed below by launch date and classified by primary genres.

References 

Middle East Broadcasting Center